Petrauskas is a Lithuanian surname. Notable people with the surname include:

Evaldas Petrauskas (born 1992), Lithuanian boxer
Kipras Petrauskas (1885–1968), Lithuanian singer
Zenonas Petrauskas (1950-2009), Lithuanian lawyer and deputy foreign minister of Lithuania, associate professor of international law

Lithuanian-language surnames